Eliphas "Safile" Shivute (born 27 September 1974) is a Namibian retired international footballer. He retired from football due to a knee injury in 2002 after a career spent in Chinese and European football, as well as domestically. Shivute became the first Namibian to play for a top-level side in Europe, and also, is the man who scored the first international goal for the Brave Warriors.

Club career
Eliphas Shivute, affectionately known as “Safile” (Elifas spelled backwards), started playing in 1989 for Namibian side Blue Waters F.C., and later Eleven Arrows F.C. He then played for German Fifth Division Schwarz-Weiss Duren in 1996, a nonprofessional side for which he scored over 13 goals in a short spell. When he scored a hat trick for Duren in one of the league matches that the Alemannia Aachen scouts spotted him and immediately entered into negotiations for a contract. This negotiations ended into Safile signing a one-year-contract with Third Division Aachen. Then he had several trials in Scotland, according to the Daily Record Staff, Safile has had trials with Dundee United F.C. and Hearts F.C. earlier, but Shivute decided to sign for Motherwell F.C. He scored twice in his trial match for and impressed Motherwell manager Alex McLeish, which Shivute admired because as youngster he followed English and Scottish football through TV and books. His first full match debut in the Scottish Premier League match in a one-all draw against league leaders Hibernians F.C. earned him the “Player of the Match” award. Safile had been playing more as a schemer-striker, drifting in and around the box.

He played with Mitherwell until 1999 when he moved to China signing with Jia-A League club Dalian Wanda FC in the costliest signing ever by then, £350,000. After one season in 2000 he shortly returned to Namibia playing for half season for his former club Eleven Arrows before moving to another Chinese top league club Shenzhen Ping'an Kejian where he will played on loan until December 2001. That winter he returned to Europe having an 8-months spell with Serbian club FK Čukarički playing in the First League of FR Yugoslavia, just before retiring. Later he played a major role in the transfer of Namibian Rudolph Bester to that club. He became the agent of Bester in 2008.

In 2006, he became assistant manager of Namibian Second Division club Invincible FC.

International career
Shivute has been part of the national team since 1992 having earned 49 caps and scored 8 times. With Namibia he was runner-up at 1997 and 1999 COSAFA Cup. He also represented Namibia at the 1998 African Cup of Nations where he scored two goals in a 3-4 loss to Ivory Coast.

Playing style
Namibia Today Sport describe him as striker with much improvisation and audacity, a great finisher, and with flair, speed, and shooting power in both foot and he was a good header.

Personal life
Safile's rise to the role of Namibian football's figurehead has not been achieved without risks. He threw away his education and the prospect of a good job in the mining industry - to follow his dream of becoming professional footballer.

Born in Olukonda, Shivute married Justine in 2003 and is a father of four children, two daughter and two sons. The eldest daughter is Monica, followed by Kwashi, Anastasia and Andrew.

Honours
National team:
Namibia
COSAFA Cup runner-up: 1997, 1999.

Personal:
Namibian Sportsman of the Year: 1997 (award attributed by Namibia National Sport Council)

References

Sources
 Eliphas Shivute speaks his mind - The Namibian, 4 September 1998
 Eliphas - A Rising Star In China - The Namibian, 4 June 1999
 Chinese to sign young Cameroon players - BBC Sport, 17 February 2001
 

1974 births
Living people
People from Oshikoto Region
Namibian men's footballers
Namibia international footballers
1998 African Cup of Nations players
Namibian expatriate footballers
Association football forwards
Blue Waters F.C. players
Eleven Arrows F.C. players
Expatriate footballers in Germany
Motherwell F.C. players
Scottish Football League players
Scottish Premier League players
Expatriate footballers in Scotland
Dalian Shide F.C. players
Shenzhen F.C. players
Expatriate footballers in China
FK Čukarički players
Expatriate footballers in Serbia and Montenegro